Dean Milwain (born 18 October 1986) is an English former competitive swimmer who represented Great Britain in the Olympics and England in the Commonwealth Games.  At the 2008 Summer Olympics in Beijing, Milwain swam for the British men's team in the individual 400m.  He was a member of the English team that won the gold medal in the men's 4x200-metre freestyle relay at the 2006 Commonwealth Games in Melbourne.

He was a part of British Swimming's Offshore centre at The Southport School (Queensland Australia) as part of a two year scholarship. During this two year period he won a Bronze Medal at the 2004 European Juniors and captained his School swim team to its first victory in 88 years at the national greater public school championship.

He is now the co-owner of the Sheffield clothing label Skull And Bones Boys Club (SABBC).

External links
British Olympic Association athlete profile
British Swimming athlete profile

1986 births
Living people
English male swimmers
Olympic swimmers of Great Britain
Commonwealth Games gold medallists for England
Swimmers at the 2006 Commonwealth Games
Swimmers at the 2008 Summer Olympics
Commonwealth Games medallists in swimming
Medallists at the 2006 Commonwealth Games